The Lakeview Museum of Arts and Sciences was a public museum of science and culture located in Peoria, Illinois.  It opened in 1965, and contained a planetarium that opened in 1963. The 36-foot planetarium was set as the sun in the largest to scale mock solar system as recognized the Guinness Book of Records in 1992.  It was closed in September 2012, shortly before the Peoria Riverfront Museum, of which Lakeview Museum's organizations were participants, opened in downtown Peoria.

References

1965 establishments in Illinois
Museums established in 1965
2012 disestablishments in Illinois
Museums disestablished in 2012
Defunct museums in Illinois